Ulitsa Akademika Korolyova is a station of the Moscow Monorail. It is located in the Ostankino District of the North-Eastern Administrative Okrug of Moscow.

History 
The station was opened on 20 November 2004 along with other 4 stations of the monorail line (All but the southern terminus Timiryazevskaya which was opened 9 days later). It began operation in "excursion mode". Only two trains were operating at the line, the interval between trains was as long as 30 minutes and station hours were from 10:00 to 16:00. The passengers could only board the trains at Ulitsa Sergeya Eisensteina station.

On 10 January 2008 the line began regular operation serving passengers and allowing them board trains at any station of the line.

Features
This station have some features in contrast to the other Moscow monorail stations:
Station has two platforms.
Closed type.

References 

Moscow Monorail
Railway stations opened in 2004